Below are the rosters of KBO League teams.

Doosan Bears

Hanwha Eagles

Kia Tigers

KT Wiz

Lotte Giants

LG Twins

NC Dinos

Nexen Heroes

Samsung Lions

SSG Landers

See also
 List of current Major League Baseball team rosters
 List of current Nippon Professional Baseball team rosters

Baseball
KBO League
KBO League